Jessie Lee Small (born November 30, 1966) is a former professional American football player who played linebacker for four seasons with the Philadelphia Eagles and the Phoenix Cardinals.

External links
Databasefootball page

1966 births
Living people
People from Thomas County, Georgia
American football linebackers
Eastern Kentucky Colonels football players
Philadelphia Eagles players
Phoenix Cardinals players
Players of American football from Georgia (U.S. state)